Bivens is a surname. Notable people with the surname include:

Beverly Bivens (born 1946), American singer
Carolyn Bivens (born 1952), American golf commissioner
Don Bivens (born 1952), American attorney
Kylie Bivens (born 1978), American soccer player 
Malcolm Bivens, American wrestler and wrestling manager
Richard Bivens (born 1979), American musician

See also
Bivens v. Six Unknown Named Agents